"" is a French expression attributed to King Louis XV of France, or in the form "" to Madame de Pompadour, his favourite. It is generally regarded as a nihilistic expression of indifference to whatever happens after one is gone, though it may also express a more literal forecasting of ruination. Its meaning is translated by Brewer in the forms "When I am dead the deluge may come for aught I care", and "Ruin, if you like, when we are dead and gone."

The phrase itself is in reference to the biblical flood and is believed to date from after the 1757 Battle of Rossbach, which was disastrous for the French. One account says that Louis XV's downcast expression while he was posing for the artist Maurice Quentin de La Tour inspired Madame de Pompadour to say:  Another account states that the Madame used the expression to laugh off ministerial objections to her extravagances. The phrase is also often seen as foretelling the French Revolution and the corresponding ruin brought to France.

The remark is usually taken out of its original context. It was made in 1757, a year which saw the crushing defeat of the French army by the Prussians at the Battle of Rossbach and the assassination attempt on the King.  The "Deluge" the King referred to was not a revolution, but the arrival of Halley's Comet, which was predicted to pass by the earth in 1757, and which was commonly blamed for having caused the Genesis flood, with predictions of a new deluge when it returned.  The King was a proficient amateur astronomer, who collaborated with the best French astronomers.  Biographer Michel Antoine wrote that the King's remark "was a manner of evoking, with his scientific culture and a good dose of black humor, this sinister year beginning with the assassination attempt by Damiens and ending with the Prussian victory". Halley's Comet finally passed the earth in April 1759, and caused enormous public attention and anxiety, but no floods.

Karl Marx and Fyodor Dostoevsky apply the phrase in their writings to describe the selfishness and apathy of certain corrupting values.

Usage 

Karl Marx wrote in Das Kapital (Vol. 1, Part III, Chapter Ten, Section 5) "" is the watchword of every capitalist and of every capitalist nation. Hence Capital is reckless of the health or length of life of the labourer, unless under compulsion from society."

During the trial of Dimitri Fyodorovich Karamazov in The Brothers Karamazov by Dostoyevsky, the prosecution uses the expression to describe the attitude of the defendant's reprobate father and to lament the deterioration of Russian values more generally. He previously used it in The Idiot, as an epigraph for an article written by one of the characters of the novel.

In his writings of the 1920s, D. H. Lawrence uses the expression a number of times, calling it "the tacit utterance of every man", in his "crisis" of unbearable "loneliness ... surrounded by nullity". But "you mustn't expect it to wait for your convenience," he warns the dissolute "younger generation"; "the real deluge lies just ahead of us".

"" was adopted as the motto of the Royal Air Force 617 Squadron, which carried out the "Dambuster" raids on German dams in the Ruhr region on the night of 16–17 May 1943.

Kurt Vonnegut used "" in his novel Player Piano (1952) when the main character Paul talks to Doctor Pond.

Russian-American singer and songwriter Regina Spektor included "" in the chorus of her song "Après Moi" from her album Begin to Hope. The song was later covered by Peter Gabriel.

See also 
 Flood myth
 Let them eat cake

Notes

References

Sources 

 
 
 
 
 
 
 

18th century in France
Catchphrases
French words and phrases
Nihilism
1750s neologisms
Louis XV
Madame de Pompadour